The European Alliance of News Agencies (EANA) is a federation of news agencies in Europe. The organisation was founded in 1956 and is based in Bern at the seat of the Swiss Telegraphic Agency (sda). As of 2015, EANA has 32 members. EANA's predecessor Agences Alliées was founded in 1924 and was active until World War II when its activities were discontinued.

According to its Statutes, the purpose of EANA is "to safeguard and promote the common interests of its members", "to secure that member news agencies can work as providers of unbiased news". EANA also states that it supports the principles of freedom of the press and shall strive to facilitate for member news agencies to work in accordance with these principles.

According to an LSE study of news agencies published in 2019, "because of their extensive embeddedness within national media systems, as well as their significant engagement with key stakeholders, news agencies offer a fruitful but neglected focus for a comprehensive and comparative study aiming to understand these structural changes in the contemporary media environment". 

Since 21 September 2018, EANA's President is Peter Kropsch, the CEO of German news agency Deutsche Presse-Agentur (dpa).

For two years since 26 September 2014 EANA's President was Clive Marshall, CEO of the British news agency Press Association (PA).

Jonas Eriksson, the CEO of the Swedish TT News Agency was President between 2016 and 2018

EANA offers each year a quality award to its members. In 2015 French news agency Agence France-Presse (AFP) and its Global News Director, Michèle Léridon, have been awarded the EANA Award for Excellence 2015.

Notes and references

External links 
 

News agencies based in Switzerland
Organizations established in 1956